Emil Galimov (born 9 May 1992) is a Russian professional ice hockey player of Tatar descent. He is currently playing with SKA Saint Petersburg of the Kontinental Hockey League (KHL). Galimov was selected by the San Jose Sharks in the 7th round (207th overall) of the 2013 NHL Entry Draft.

Playing career
Galimov made his Kontinental Hockey League debut playing with HC Neftekhimik Nizhnekamsk during the 2010–11 KHL season.

Galimov moved to Lokomotiv Yaroslavl, spending six seasons with the club, before he was traded in a return for a second stint with his original club, Neftekhimik Nizhnekamsk prior to the 2017–18 season on August 16, 2017. In the 2018–19 season, Galimov was selected to captain Nizhnekamsk, posting 8 goals and 15 points in 50 games.

On May 6, 2019, Galimov left Nizhnekamsk for the second occasion, signing a one-year contract as a free agent with Ak Bars Kazan. In the 2019–20 season, Galimov rebounded offensively in Kazan, recording 14 goals in 47 games. He registered 3 post-season goals in just 4 games before the season was cancelled due to COVID-19.

On May 1, 2020, Galimov agreed to a two-year contract as a free agent with SKA Saint Petersburg.

Career statistics

Regular season and playoffs

International

References

External links

1992 births
Living people
Ak Bars Kazan players
Lokomotiv Yaroslavl players
HC Neftekhimik Nizhnekamsk players
Russian ice hockey forwards
People from Nizhnekamsk
San Jose Sharks draft picks
SKA Saint Petersburg players
Tatar people of Russia
Tatar sportspeople
Volga Tatars
Sportspeople from Tatarstan